Will Fyffe, CBE (16 February 1885 – 14 December 1947) was a Scottish music hall and performing artist, a star of the 1930s and 1940s, on stage and screen.

Fyffe made his debut in his father's stock company at the age of six. He travelled extensively throughout Scotland and the rest of the UK, playing the numerous music halls of the time, where he performed his sketches and sang his songs in his own inimitable style. During the 1930s, he was one of the highest paid musical hall artistes in Britain.

In addition, Fyffe appeared in 23 major films of the era (American and British), sometimes starring, and recorded over 30 songs, delivered with his own unique style.

His singer-songwriter skills are still well-known today, particularly his own composition, "I Belong To Glasgow". This song has been covered by Danny Kaye, Eartha Kitt, Gracie Fields and Kirk Douglas:

"If your money, you spend,
 You've nothing to lend,
 Isn't that all the better for you"

Fyffe was also Freemason, who was initiated and then became a full member of Lodge St John, Shotts No 471.
Fyffe left some rare footage of his stage act, which gives us a glimpse of stage life in those times. In the footage, he performs the "Broomielaw" sketch and sings his song "Twelve and a Tanner a Bottle". The footage came about as a result of a screen test, shot for Pathe in New York in 1929.

Fyffe died after falling from a window in the Rusacks Hotel in St Andrews in December 1947. The fall has been attributed to dizziness caused by an operation on his ear.

Early life and career
Will Fyffe was born, on 16 February 1885, in a tenement at 36 Broughty Ferry Road, Dundee, 
 the eldest child of John Fyffe (1864–1928), a ship's carpenter, and a music teacher, Janet Rhynd Cunningham (1858–1949).

His father was interested in theatrical entertainment and operated a Penny Geggy, in which the young Will gained valuable experience as a character actor, as he travelled around the Lowlands of Scotland.

In his twenties, Fyffe joined Will Haggar Junior's Castle Theatre company, touring the South Wales Valleys from its base in Abergavenny. Fyffe and his wife feature in an advert for the Castle Theatre in the Portable Times in 1911.

Fyffe's screen debut was in 1914 when William Haggar, Will Junior's father and a pioneer silent film producer, made an epic 50-minute version of the classic Welsh Tale, The Maid of Cefn Ydfa, which was first screened in Aberdare in December of that year. Reviewed in The South Wales Echo in 1938, the film disappeared, but was rediscovered in 1984 in a family cupboard and conserved: 38 minutes survives, in the Welsh Film Archive in Aberystwyth. In the film, Fyffe plays Lewis Bach, the loyal servant of the maid. He appealed against conscription in 1918 on grounds of his occupation, serious hardship and ill health.

As a character actor, he was much in demand in Hollywood and Britain, starring and co-starring in dozens of productions, with the likes of Finlay Currie, Patricia Roc, John Laurie, Duncan MacRae, John Gielgud, Douglas Fairbanks Jr, Margaret Lockwood and Charles Hawtrey. His last film was The Brothers, which was released shortly after his death. In Owd Bob, (To The Victor in America), Fyffe plays the 'likeable old curmudgeon', McAdam,. The New York Times describes Fyffe's performance as fitting "snugly into the mental dossier we have been compiling under the heading, great performances".

Although he became well known as a talented actor for the breadth of his on-screen characterisations, Fyffe was also a successful music hall artist (singer-songwriter and comedian), creating a succession of comic characters, whose story he narrated with his unique form of delivery – Fyffe would start his song, pausing in the middle to give a monologue with further detail of the song's storyline, before resuming the song where he left off. Listen to the stories of the 94-year-old bridegroom and his three scheming sons in "I'm 94 Today", and the proud new father in "You Can Come And See The Baby". 'Daft Sandy', the village idiot, was one of Fyffe's most popular characters – the drama critic, James Agate, referred to this as "a masterpiece of tragi-comedy". Will Fyffe had the ability to create a character and then seem to actually be that character.

In 1937, Fyffe appeared in the Royal Command Performance at the London Palladium, one of numerous appearances, and became regarded as Queen Elizabeth's favourite entertainer. As one local commentator put it:
" … we are sure the lasting thrill for us all was the finale, Will Fyffe, a wonderful Scottish comedian, was top of the bill. To finish, he sang a song. On the second chorus, the scenery changed completely, and down the aisles came Scottish Pipers. The artists all appeared around a rostrum in front of the orchestra, and we filled the stage, in Scout uniform complete with red scarf. It was the greatest thrill of our young lives. As the National Anthem was played, we faced the Royal Box and sang as we had never sung before."

For a period, Fyffe developed a successful stage partnership with Harry Gordon, playing opposite him in pantomime for many years, most notably at the famed Alhambra Theatre Glasgow.

In 1939 Fyffe was the ninth most popular British star at the box office. He was appointed a CBE in 1942.

I Belong To Glasgow
It was when Fyffe wrote and recorded the song "I Belong to Glasgow" that he became a worldwide star. According to Albert Mackie's The Scotch Comedians (1973), Fyffe found the inspiration for the song from a drunk he met at Glasgow Central Station. The drunk was "genial and demonstrative" and "laying off about Karl Marx and John Barleycorn with equal enthusiasm". Fyffe asked him: "Do you belong to Glasgow?" and the man replied: "At the moment, at the moment, Glasgow belongs to me."

The song is believed to have been written in 1920 although it is unclear if it was first released that year. A known release of the song in 1921 shows it as a "B" side to "I'm 94 To-Day". The song was released as an "A" side in 1927.

He was so popular that the Empire Theatre in Glasgow ran a 'Will Fyffe' competition, with dozens of entrants singing "I Belong to Glasgow".  Heavily disguised as himself, Fyffe entered the competition for a bet, but he could only win second prize. According to theatre manager and historian, W. J. MacQueen-Pope: "Will Fyffe was a man of great honesty and integrity", and this comes across in his songs when heard today.

It was by falling from a hotel room window that Fyffe met his death. After an operation on his right ear in 1947, Fyffe went to recuperate at his own hotel in St Andrews. One night, he fell from the window of his suite and was taken to the local cottage hospital, where he later died.

Fyffe was buried in his adopted home city of Glasgow, at Lambhill Cemetery, three days later.

Fyffe was survived by a son, Will Fyffe Jr. (1927–2008), a musical director who wrote a musical about his father's life, and a daughter, Eileen.

Filmography

 The Maid of Cefn Ydfa (1914, Short) - Lewis Bach
 Elstree Calling (1930) - Himself
 Happy (1933) - Simmy
 Rolling Home (1935) - John McGregor
 Debt of Honour (1936) - Fergus McAndrews 
 Love in Exile (1936) - Doc Tate
 Men of Yesterday (1936)
 Well Done, Henry (1936) - Henry McNab
 King of Hearts (1936) - Bill Saunders
 Spring Handicap (1937) - Jack Clayton
 Cotton Queen (1937) - Bill Todcastle
 Said O'Reilly to McNab (1937) - Malcolm McNab
 Owd Bob (1938) - Adam McAdam
 The Mind of Mr. Reeder (1939) - J.G. Reeder
 Annie Laurie (1939) - Will Laurie
 The Missing People (1939) - J. G. Reeder
 Rulers of the Sea (1939) - John Shaw
 They Came by Night (1940) - James Fothergill
 For Freedom (1940) - Chief
 Neutral Port (1940) - Capt. Ferguson
 Welfare of the Workers (1940) - Himself
 The Prime Minister (1941) - The Agitator
 Heaven Is Round the Corner (1944) - Dougal
 Give Me the Stars (1944) - Hector MacTavish
 The Brothers (1947) - Aeneas McGrath (final film role)

Discography
Ah'm Feart For Mrs. McKie (1931)
Clyde Built
Corporal McDougall (1939)
Daft Sandy (1930)
Doctor McGregor (1926)
Down in the Quarry Where The Bluebells Grow (1926)
He's Been Oan The Bottle Since A Baby (1932)
I Belong To Glasgow (1927)  (Animated footage)
I'm 94 Today (1929) (Live footage)
I'm The Landlord of the Inn in Aberfoyle (1932)
It Isn't The Hen That Cackles The Most
McPherson's Wedding Breakfast (1930)
Sailing Up The Clyde (1927)
She Was The Belle of the Ball (1929)
Sheila McKay (1929)
The Skipper of the Mercantile Marine (1939)
The Centenarian (1927)
The Gamekeeper (1927)
The Railway Guard (1930)
The Spirit O The Man Fae Aberdeen (1931, Walsh & Fyffe)
The Train That's Taking You Home (1929)
The Waddin O Mary Maclean (1931, Martin & Fyffe)
Twelve and a Tanner A Bottle (1929) (Live footage)
Uncle Mac (1931)
Ye Can Come And See The Baby (1927)
The 'Broomielaw' Sketch (1929)  (Live footage)

Archive footage
The Scottish Screen Archive (includes the Broomielaw sketch and the song Twelve and a Tanner A Bottle.

References

External links
Will Fyffe on Time Out
Will Fyffe on Fandango
Will Fyffe on Vimeo (I Belong To Glasgow - Animated Footage)

20th-century Scottish male singers
1885 births
1947 deaths
Music hall performers
Scottish male film actors
Scottish male stage actors
People from Dundee
20th-century Scottish male actors
Male actors from Dundee